Nothing but the Truth: A Documentary Novel is a 1991 novel written by Avi. The novel is historical fiction. It tells the story of an incident in a fictional New Hampshire town where a boy is suspended for humming the United States National Anthem as well as the effects of this story receiving national publicity. The main theme of the novel is the subjectivity of truth and that while individual statements may be true, taken separately they may not give an accurate picture of an event.

Nothing but the Truth won a 1992 Newbery Honor. The novel was later adapted into a play.

References

1991 American novels
Epistolary novels
Newbery Honor-winning works
Novels by Avi
American young adult novels
Novels set in New Hampshire
Fiction with unreliable narrators
Novels set in schools
1991 children's books